Ọládàpọ̀ (alternatively spelled Ladapo) is a Nigerian given name of Yoruba origin meaning "a combination of prestige, success and wealth has been mixed together (alike)".

People with Oladapo as first/given name
 D'banj Nigerian musician
 Oladapo Afolabi (born 3 October 1953), former Nigerian academic.
 Oladapo Ayoola, Nigerian footballer.
 Oladapo "Dee" Ayuba, British basketball player.
 Oladapo Fagbenle, British entrepreneur, music video producer, director, and former NCAA athlete.
 Oladapo Olufemi (born 5 November 1988), Nigerian footballer.
 Da Grin born Oladapo Olaitan Olaonipekun (21 October 1987 – 22 April 2010), award-winning Nigerian rapper.
Oba Ladapo Ademola II  (1872–1962), Alake of Abeokuta

People with Oladapo as middle name
 Brian Oladapo Idowu (born 18 May 1992), Russian professional football player of Nigerian origin.
 Hosea Oladapo Ehinlanwo (born 2 August 1938), Nigerian Senator for the Ondo South constituency of Ondo State, Nigeria.
 John Oladapo Obafunwa, Nigerian vice chancellor of Lagos State University.
 Olúfẹ́mi Ọládàpọ̀ Babalọlá, incumbent Obalumo in Òkè-Ìlá and Ìlá, Nigeria.

People with Oladapo as last/family name
Freddie Ladapo, British athlete
 Adebayo Oladapo, Nigerian athlete.
 Georgina Oladapo, British athlete.
 Ifedayo Oladapo, (1932 - 2010) Nigerian engineer, former academic at the University of Lagos.
 Joyce Oladapo née Hepher (born 11 February 1964), retired British long jumper.
 Olatubosun Oladapo also known as Tubosun Oladapo and Odidere Aiyekooto (September 1943), Nigerian folk poet.

References

Nigerian names
Yoruba given names
Yoruba-language surnames
African masculine given names